Freethought (sometimes spelled free thought) is an epistemological viewpoint which holds that beliefs should not be formed on the basis of authority, tradition, revelation, or dogma, and that beliefs should instead be reached by other methods such as logic, reason, and empirical observation. According to the Oxford English Dictionary, a freethinker is "a person who forms their own ideas and opinions rather than accepting those of other people, especially in religious teaching." In some contemporary thought in particular, free thought is strongly tied with rejection of traditional social or religious belief systems. The cognitive application of free thought is known as "freethinking", and practitioners of free thought are known as "freethinkers". Modern freethinkers consider free thought to be a natural freedom from all negative and illusive thoughts acquired from society.

The term first came into use in the 17th century in order to refer to people who inquired into the basis of traditional beliefs which were often accepted unquestioningly. Today, freethinking is most closely linked with deism, secularism, humanism, anti-clericalism, and religious critique. The Oxford English Dictionary defines freethinking as, "The free exercise of reason in matters of religious belief, unrestrained by deference to authority; the adoption of the principles of a free-thinker." Freethinkers hold that knowledge should be grounded in facts, scientific inquiry, and logic. The skeptical application of science implies freedom from the intellectually limiting effects of confirmation bias, cognitive bias, conventional wisdom, popular culture, urban myth, prejudice, or sectarianism.

Definition
Atheist author Adam Lee defines free thought as thinking which is independent of revelation, tradition, established belief, and authority, and considers it as a "broader umbrella" than atheism "that embraces a rainbow of unorthodoxy, religious dissent, skepticism, and unconventional thinking."

The basic summarizing statement of the essay The Ethics of Belief by the 19th-century British mathematician and philosopher William Kingdon Clifford is: "It is wrong always, everywhere, and for anyone, to believe anything upon insufficient evidence." The essay became a rallying cry for freethinkers when published in the 1870s, and has been described as a point when freethinkers grabbed the moral high ground. Clifford was himself an organizer of free thought gatherings, the driving force behind the Congress of Liberal Thinkers held in 1878.

Regarding religion, freethinkers typically hold that there is insufficient evidence to support the existence of supernatural phenomena. According to the Freedom from Religion Foundation, "No one can be a freethinker who demands conformity to a bible, creed, or messiah. To the freethinker, revelation and faith are invalid, and orthodoxy is no guarantee of truth." and "Freethinkers are convinced that religious claims have not withstood the tests of reason. Not only is there nothing to be gained by believing an untruth, but there is everything to lose when we sacrifice the indispensable tool of reason on the altar of superstition. Most freethinkers consider religion to be not only untrue, but harmful."

However, philosopher Bertrand Russell wrote the following in his 1944 essay "The Value of Free Thought:"

The whole first paragraph of the essay makes it clear that a freethinker is not necessarily an atheist or an agnostic, as long as he or she satisfies this definition:

Fred Edwords, former executive of the American Humanist Association, suggests that by Russell's definition, liberal religionists who have challenged established orthodoxies can be considered freethinkers.

On the other hand, according to Bertrand Russell, atheists and/or agnostics are not necessarily freethinkers. As an example, he mentions Stalin, whom he compares to a "pope":

In the 18th and 19th century, many thinkers regarded as freethinkers were deists, arguing that the nature of God can only be known from a study of nature rather than from religious revelation. In the 18th century, "deism" was as much of a 'dirty word' as "atheism", and deists were often stigmatized as either atheists or at least as freethinkers by their Christian opponents. Deists today regard themselves as freethinkers, but are now arguably less prominent in the free thought movement than atheists.

Characteristics
Among freethinkers, for a notion to be considered true it must be testable, verifiable, and logical. Many freethinkers tend to be humanists, who base morality on human needs and would find meaning in human compassion, social progress, art, personal happiness, love, and the furtherance of knowledge. Generally, freethinkers like to think for themselves, tend to be skeptical, respect critical thinking and reason, remain open to new concepts, and are sometimes proud of their own individuality. They would determine truth for themselves – based upon knowledge they gain, answers they receive, experiences they have and the balance they thus acquire. Freethinkers reject conformity for the sake of conformity, whereby they create their own beliefs by considering the way the world around them works and would possess the intellectual integrity and courage to think outside of accepted norms, which may or may not lead them to believe in some higher power.

Symbol

The pansy serves as the long-established and enduring symbol of free thought; literature of the American Secular Union inaugurated its usage in the late 1800s. The reasoning behind the pansy as the symbol of free thought lies both in the flower's name and in its appearance. The pansy derives its name from the French word pensée, which means "thought". It allegedly received this name because the flower is perceived by some to bear resemblance to a human face, and in mid-to-late summer it nods forward as if deep in thought. This need seems to have been met by the Freethinkers of France, Belgium, Spain and Sweden, who have adopted the pansy as their badge. We join with them in recommending this flower as a simple and inexpensive badge of Freethought...Let every patriot who is a Freethinker in this sense, adopt the pansy as his badge, to be worn at all times, as a silent and unobtrusive testimony of his principles. In this way we shall recognize our brethren in the cause, and the enthusiasm will spread; until, before long, the uplifted standard of the pansy, beneath the sheltering folds of the United States flag, shall everywhere thrill men's hearts as the symbol of religious liberty and freedom of conscience."

History

Pre-modern movement
Critical thought has flourished in the Hellenistic Mediterranean, in the repositories of knowledge and wisdom in Ireland and in the Iranian civilizations (for example in the era of Khayyam (1048–1131) and his unorthodox Sufi Rubaiyat poems). Later societies made advances on freedom of thought such as the Chinese (note for example the seafaring renaissance of the Southern Song dynasty of 1127–1279), on through heretical thinkers on esoteric alchemy or astrology, to the Renaissance and the Protestant Reformation pioneered by Martin Luther.

French physician and writer Rabelais celebrated "rabelaisian" freedom as well as good feasting and drinking (an expression and a symbol of freedom of the mind) in defiance of the hypocrisies of conformist orthodoxy in his utopian Thelema Abbey (from θέλημα: free "will"), the device of which was Do What Thou Wilt:

So had Gargantua established it. In all their rule and strictest tie of their order there was but this one clause to be observed, Do What Thou Wilt; because free people ... act virtuously and avoid vice. They call this honor.

When Rabelais's hero Pantagruel journeys to the "Oracle of The Div(in)e Bottle", he learns the lesson of life in one simple word: "Trinch!", Drink! Enjoy the simple life, learn wisdom and knowledge, as a free human. Beyond puns, irony, and satire, Gargantua's prologue-metaphor instructs the reader to "break the bone and suck out the substance-full marrow" ("la substantifique moëlle"), the core of wisdom.

Modern movements
The year 1600 is considered a landmark in the era of modern free thought. It was the year of the execution in Italy of Giordano Bruno, a former Dominican friar, by the Inquisition.

Australia 
Prior to World War II, Australia had high rates of Protestantism and Catholicism. Post-war Australia has become a highly secularised country. Donald Horne, one of Australia's well-known public intellectuals, believed rising prosperity in post-war Australia influenced the decline in church-going and general lack of interest in religion. "Churches no longer matter very much to most Australians. If there is a happy eternal life it's for everyone ... For many Australians the pleasures of this life are sufficiently satisfying that religion offers nothing of great appeal", said Horne in his landmark work The Lucky Country (1964).

Belgium

The Université Libre de Bruxelles and the Vrije Universiteit Brussel, along with the two Circles of Free Inquiry (Dutch and French speaking), defend the freedom of critical thought, lay philosophy and ethics, while rejecting the argument of authority.

Canada
In 1873 a handful of secularists founded the earliest known secular organization in English Canada, the Toronto Freethought Association. Reorganized in 1877 and again in 1881, when it was renamed the Toronto Secular Society, the group formed the nucleus of the Canadian Secular Union, established in 1884 to bring together freethinkers from across the country.

A significant number of the early members appear to have come from the educated labour "aristocracy", including Alfred F. Jury, J. Ick Evans and J. I. Livingstone, all of whom were leading labour activists and secularists. The second president of the Toronto association, T. Phillips Thompson, became a central figure in the city's labour and social-reform movements during the 1880s and 1890s and arguably Canada's foremost late nineteenth-century labour intellectual. By the early 1880s scattered free thought organizations operated throughout southern Ontario and parts of Quebec, eliciting both urban and rural support.

The principal organ of the free thought movement in Canada was Secular Thought (Toronto, 1887–1911). Founded and edited during its first several years by English freethinker Charles Watts (1835–1906), it came under the editorship of Toronto printer and publisher James Spencer Ellis in 1891 when Watts returned to England. In 1968 the Humanist Association of Canada (HAC) formed to serve as an umbrella group for humanists, atheists, and freethinkers, and to champion social justice issues and oppose religious influence on public policy—most notably in the fight to make access to abortion free and legal in Canada.

England
The term freethinker emerged towards the end of the 17th century in England to describe those who stood in opposition to the institution of the Church, and the literal belief in the Bible. The beliefs of these individuals were centered on the concept that people could understand the world through consideration of nature. Such positions were formally documented for the first time in 1697 by William Molyneux in a widely publicized letter to John Locke, and more extensively in 1713, when Anthony Collins wrote his Discourse of Free-thinking, which gained substantial popularity. This essay attacks the clergy of all churches and it is a plea for deism.

The Freethinker magazine was first published in Britain in 1881; it continued in print until 2014, and still exists as a web-based publication.

France
In France, the concept first appeared in publication in 1765 when Denis Diderot, Jean le Rond d'Alembert, and Voltaire included an article on Liberté de penser in their Encyclopédie. The concept of free thought spread so widely that even places as remote as the Jotunheimen, in Norway, had well-known freethinkers such as Jo Gjende by the 19th century.

François-Jean Lefebvre de la Barre (1745–1766) was a young French nobleman, famous for having been tortured and beheaded before his body was burnt on a pyre along with Voltaire's Philosophical Dictionary. La Barre is often said to have been executed for not saluting a Roman Catholic religious procession, but the elements of the case were far more complex.

In France, Lefebvre de la Barre is widely regarded a symbol of the victims of Christian religious intolerance; La Barre along with Jean Calas and Pierre-Paul Sirven, was championed by Voltaire. A second replacement statue to de la Barre stands nearby the Basilica of the Sacred Heart of Jesus of Paris at the summit of the butte Montmartre (itself named from the Temple of Mars), the highest point in Paris and an 18th arrondissement street nearby the Sacré-Cœur is also named after Lefebvre de la Barre.

The 19th century saw the emergence of a specific notion of Libre-Pensée ("free thought"), with writer Victor Hugo as one of its major early proponents. French Freethinkers (Libre-Penseurs) associate freedom of thought, political anti-clericalism and socialist leanings. The main organisation referring to this tradition to this day is the Fédération nationale de la libre pensée, created in 1890.

Germany
In Germany, during the period 1815–1848 and before the March Revolution, the resistance of citizens against the dogma of the church increased. In 1844, under the influence of Johannes Ronge and Robert Blum, belief in the rights of man, tolerance among men, and humanism grew, and by 1859 they had established the Bund Freireligiöser Gemeinden Deutschlands (literally Union of Free Religious Communities of Germany), an association of persons who consider themselves to be religious without adhering to any established and institutionalized church or sacerdotal cult. This union still exists today, and is included as a member in the umbrella organization of free humanists. In 1881 in Frankfurt am Main, Ludwig Büchner established the Deutscher Freidenkerbund (German Freethinkers League) as the first German organization for atheists and agnostics. In 1892 the Freidenker-Gesellschaft and in 1906 the Deutscher Monistenbund were formed.

Free thought organizations developed the "Jugendweihe" (literally Youth consecration), a secular "confirmation" ceremony, and atheist funeral rites. The Union of Freethinkers for Cremation was founded in 1905, and the Central Union of German Proletariat Freethinker in 1908. The two groups merged in 1927, becoming the German Freethinking Association in 1930.

More "bourgeois" organizations declined after World War I, and "proletarian" free thought groups proliferated, becoming an organization of socialist parties. European socialist free thought groups formed the International of Proletarian Freethinkers (IPF) in 1925. Activists agitated for Germans to disaffiliate from their respective Church and for seculari-zation of elementary schools; between 1919–21 and 1930–32 more than 2.5 million Germans, for the most part supporters of the Social Democratic and Communist parties, gave up church membership. Conflict developed between radical forces including the Soviet League of the Militant Godless and Social Democratic forces in Western Europe led by Theodor Hartwig and Max Sievers. In 1930 the Soviet and allied delegations, following a walk-out, took over the IPF and excluded the former leaders.
Following Hitler's rise to power in 1933, most free thought organizations were banned, though some right-wing groups that worked with so-called Völkische Bünde (literally "ethnic" associations with nationalist, xenophobic and very often racist ideology) were tolerated by the Nazis until the mid-1930s.

Netherlands
In the Netherlands, free thought has existed in organized form since the establishment of De Dageraad (now known as De Vrije Gedachte) in 1856. Among its most notable subscribing 19th century individuals were Johannes van Vloten, Multatuli, Adriaan Gerhard and Domela Nieuwenhuis.

In 2009, Frans van Dongen established the Atheist-Secular Party, which takes a considerably restrictive view of religion and public religious expressions.

Since the 19th century, free thought in the Netherlands has become more well known as a political phenomenon through at least three currents: liberal freethinking, conservative freethinking, and classical freethinking. In other words, parties which identify as freethinking tend to favor non-doctrinal, rational approaches to their preferred ideologies, and arose as secular alternatives to both clerically aligned parties as well as labor-aligned parties. Common themes among freethinking political parties are "freedom", "liberty", and "individualism".

Switzerland 

With the introduction of cantonal church taxes in the 1870s, anti-clericals began to organise themselves. Around 1870, a "freethinkers club" was founded in Zürich. During the debate on the Zürich church law in 1883, professor Friedrich Salomon Vögelin and city council member Kunz proposed to separate church and state.

Turkey
In the last years of the Ottoman Empire, free thought made its voice heard by the works of distinguished people such as Ahmet Rıza, Tevfik Fikret, Abdullah Cevdet, Kılıçzade Hakkı, and Celal Nuri İleri. These intellectuals affected the early period of the Turkish Republic. Mustafa Kemal Atatürk –field marshal, revolutionary statesman, author, and founder of the secular Turkish nation state, serving as its first President from 1923 until his death in 1938– was the practitioner of their ideas. He made many reforms that modernized the country. Sources point out that Atatürk was a religious skeptic and a freethinker. He was a non-doctrinaire deist or an atheist, who was antireligious and anti-Islamic in general. According to Atatürk, the Turkish people do not know what Islam really is and do not read the Quran. People are influenced by Arabic sentences that they do not understand, and because of their customs they go to mosques. When the Turks read the Quran and think about it, they will leave Islam. Atatürk described Islam as the religion of the Arabs in his own work titled Vatandaş için Medeni Bilgiler by his own critical and nationalist views.

Association of Atheism (Ateizm Derneği), the first official atheist organisation in Middle East and Caucasus, was founded in 2014. It serves to support irreligious people and freethinkers in Turkey who are discriminated against based on their views. In 2018 it was reported in some media outlets that the Ateizm Derneği would close down because of the pressure on its members and attacks by pro-government media, but the association itself issued a clarification that this was not the case and that it was still active.

United States
The Free Thought movement first organized itself in the United States as the "Free Press Association" in 1827 in defense of George Houston, publisher of The Correspondent, an early journal of Biblical criticism in an era when blasphemy convictions were still possible. Houston had helped found an Owenite community at Haverstraw, New York in 1826–27. The short-lived Correspondent was superseded by the Free Enquirer, the official organ of Robert Owen's New Harmony community in Indiana, edited by Robert Dale Owen and by Fanny Wright between 1828 and 1832 in New York. During this time Robert Dale Owen sought to introduce the philosophic skepticism of the Free Thought movement into the Workingmen's Party in New York City. The Free Enquirer'''s annual civic celebrations of Paine's birthday after 1825 finally coalesced in 1836 in the first national Free Thinkers organization, the "United States Moral and Philosophical Society for the General Diffusion of Useful Knowledge". It was founded on August 1, 1836, at a national convention at the Lyceum in Saratoga Springs with Isaac S. Smith of Buffalo, New York, as president. Smith was also the 1836 Equal Rights Party's candidate for Governor of New York and had also been the Workingmen's Party candidate for Lt. Governor of New York in 1830. The Moral and Philosophical Society published The Beacon, edited by Gilbert Vale.

Driven by the revolutions of 1848 in the German states, the 19th century saw an immigration of German freethinkers and anti-clericalists to the United States (see Forty-Eighters). In the United States, they hoped to be able to live by their principles, without interference from government and church authorities.

Many Freethinkers settled in German immigrant strongholds, including St. Louis, Indianapolis, Wisconsin, and Texas, where they founded the town of Comfort, Texas, as well as others.

These groups of German Freethinkers referred to their organizations as Freie Gemeinden, or "free congregations". The first Freie Gemeinde was established in St. Louis in 1850. Others followed in Pennsylvania, California, Washington, D.C., New York, Illinois, Wisconsin, Texas, and other states.

Freethinkers tended to be liberal, espousing ideals such as racial, social, and sexual equality, and the abolition of slavery.

The "Golden Age of Freethought" in the US came in the late 1800s. The dominant organization was the National Liberal League which formed in 1876 in Philadelphia. This group re-formed itself in 1885 as the American Secular Union under the leadership of the eminent agnostic orator Robert G. Ingersoll. Following Ingersoll's death in 1899 the organization declined, in part due to lack of effective leadership.

Free thought in the United States declined in the early twentieth century. By the early twentieth century, most free thought congregations had disbanded or joined other mainstream churches. The longest continuously operating free thought congregation in America is the Free Congregation of Sauk County, Wisconsin, which was founded in 1852 and is still active . It affiliated with the American Unitarian Association (now the Unitarian Universalist Association) in 1955. D. M. Bennett was the founder and publisher of The Truth Seeker in 1873, a radical free thought and reform American periodical.

German Freethinker settlements were located in:
 Burlington, Racine County, Wisconsin
 Belleville, St. Clair County, Illinois
 Castell, Llano County, Texas
 Comfort, Kendall County, Texas
 Davenport, Scott County, Iowa
 Fond du Lac, Fond du Lac County, Wisconsin
 Frelsburg, Colorado County, Texas
 Hermann, Gasconade County, Missouri
 Jefferson, Jefferson County, Wisconsin
 Indianapolis, Indiana
 Latium, Washington County, Texas
 Manitowoc, Manitowoc County, Wisconsin
 Meyersville, DeWitt County, Texas
 Milwaukee, Wisconsin
 Millheim, Austin County, Texas
 Oshkosh, Winnebago County, Wisconsin
 Ratcliffe, DeWitt County, Texas
 Sauk City, Sauk County, Wisconsin
 Shelby, Austin County, Texas
 Sisterdale, Kendall County, Texas
 St. Louis, Missouri
 Tusculum, Kendall County, Texas
 Two Rivers, Manitowoc County, Wisconsin
 Watertown, Dodge County, Wisconsin

Anarchism

 United States tradition 
Free thought influenced the development of  anarchism in the United States of America. In the U.S., "free thought was a basically anti-Christian, anti-clerical movement, whose purpose was to make the individual politically and spiritually free to decide for himself on religious matters. A number of contributors to Liberty were prominent figures in both free thought and anarchism. The  American individualist anarchist  George MacDonald [(1857–1944)] was a co-editor of Freethought and, for a time, The Truth Seeker. E.C. Walker was co-editor of the freethought/free love journal Lucifer, the Light-Bearer." "Many of the anarchists were ardent freethinkers; reprints from free thought papers such as Lucifer, the Light-Bearer, Freethought and The Truth Seeker appeared in Liberty...The church was viewed as a common ally of the state and as a repressive force in and of itself."

 European tradition 
In Europe, a similar development occurred in French and Spanish individualist anarchist circles:  "Anticlericalism, just as in the rest of the libertarian movement, in another of the frequent elements which will gain relevance related to the measure in which the (French) Republic begins to have conflicts with the church...Anti-clerical discourse, frequently called for by the French individualist André Lorulot [(1885-1963)], will have its impacts in Estudios (a Spanish  individualist anarchist publication). There will be an attack on institutionalized religion for the responsibility that it had in the past on negative developments, for its irrationality which makes it a counterpoint of philosophical and scientific progress. There will be a criticism of proselytism and ideological manipulation which happens on both believers and agnostics". These tendencies would continue in French individualist anarchism in the work and activism of Charles-Auguste Bontemps (1893-1981) and others. In the Spanish individualist anarchist magazines Ética and Iniciales "there is a strong interest in publishing scientific news, usually linked to a certain atheist and anti-theist obsession, philosophy which will also work for pointing out the incompatibility between science and religion, faith, and reason. In this way there will be a lot of talk on  Darwin's theories or on the negation of the existence of the soul".

In 1901 the Catalan anarchist and freethinker Francesc Ferrer i Guàrdia established "modern" or  progressive schools in Barcelona in defiance of an educational system controlled by the Catholic Church.
The schools had the stated goal to "educate the working class in a rational, secular and non-coercive setting". Fiercely anti-clerical, Ferrer believed in "freedom in education", education free from the authority of church and state.
Ferrer's ideas, generally, formed the inspiration for a series of  Modern Schools in the United States, Cuba, South America and London. The first of these started in New York City in 1911. Ferrer also inspired the Italian newspaper  Università popolare, founded in 1901.

See also

 Notes and references 

Further reading

Alexander, Nathan G. (2019). Race in a Godless World: Atheism, Race, and Civilization, 1850-1914. New York/Manchester: New York University Press/Manchester University Press. 
Alexander Nathan G. "Unclasping the Eagle's Talons: Mark Twain, American Freethought, and the Responses to Imperialism." The Journal of the Gilded Age and Progressive Era 17, no. 3 (2018): 524–545.
Bury, John Bagnell. (1913). A History of Freedom of Thought. New York: Henry Holt and Company.
Jacoby, Susan. (2004). Freethinkers: A History of American Secularism. New York: Metropolitan Books. 
Putnam, Samuel Porter. (1894). Four Hundred Years of Freethought. New York: Truth Seeker Company.
Royle, Edward. (1974). Victorian Infidels: The Origins of the British Secularist Movement, 1791–1866. Manchester: Manchester University Press. 
Royle, Edward. (1980). Radicals, Secularists and Republicans: popular freethought in Britain, 1866–1915. Manchester: Manchester University Press. 
Tribe, David. (1967). 100 Years of Freethought''. London: Elek Books.

External links

 
Freethinker Indonesia 
A History of Freethought
Young Freethought

[https://www.youtube.com/watch?v=IPDWB0iD77E Freethought In A Nutshell by the North Texas Church of Freethought
]

 
Anarchist theory
Civil disobedience
Critical thinking
Criticism of religion
Empiricism
Epistemological theories
Epistemology of religion
Freedom of expression
History of logic
History of philosophy
History of religion
Humanism
Intellectual history
Intellectualism
Logic
Metaphysics of mind
Philosophical concepts
Progress
Psychological concepts
Rationalism
Reasoning
Secular humanism
Secularism
Skepticism
Thought
Truth